The 1980–81 United Counties League season was the 74th in the history of the United Counties League, a football competition in England. At the end of the previous season reserve teams from Division One were transferred to newly established reserve division, they were replaced by clubs from Division Two.

Premier Division

The Premier Division featured 18 clubs which competed in the division last season, no new clubs joined the division this season.

League table

Division One

Division One featured nine clubs which competed in the division last season, along with eight new clubs.
Clubs joined from Division Two:
Burton Park Wanderers
Cottingham
Raunds Town
Sharnbrook
Thrapston Venturas
Towcester Town
Plus:
Olney Town, relegated from the Premier Division
Stevenage Borough, new club

Also, Irchester United changed name to Irchester Eastfield.

League table

References

External links
 United Counties League

1980–81 in English football leagues
United Counties League seasons